Jaria (also Romanized as Jarīā, Jereyā, and Jeryā; also known as Girieh, Girya, and Gīryeh) is a village in Haram Rud-e Sofla Rural District, Samen District, Malayer County, Hamadan Province, Iran. At the 2006 census, its population was 228, in 57 families.

References 

Populated places in Malayer County